We're About the Business is a studio album released on April 24, 2007 by the Washington, D.C.-based go-go musician Chuck Brown. We're About the Business was Chuck Brown's highest-charting album ever, which peaked on May 12, 2007 at #2 on the "Top R&B/Hip-Hop Albums" and #37 on the "Billboard Pop Albums".

Track listing

Personnel
Chuck Brown – lead vocals, electric guitar
Greg Boyer – trombone
Brad Clements – trumpet
DJ Kool – guest vocals
David Dyson – bass guitar
Vince Evans – keyboards
Maurice "Mighty Moe" Hagans – percussion
Roosevelt Harrell – drums
Bryan Mills – saxophone
"Sweet" Cherie Mitchell – keyboards, vocals
Mark Williams – trombone

Charts

Album

Singles

References

External links
We're About the Business at Discogs
We're About the Business Chuck Brown interview with NPR's All Things Considered

2007 albums
Chuck Brown albums
Jazz-funk albums